Vladimir Apollonovich Olokhov (21 January 1857 - 14 December 1920) was a Russian military leader, hero of the First World War, general from infantry.

Biography 
Orthodox. From the nobles of the Livonia province. The son of Major General Apollon Alekseevich Olokhov (1815-1866).

He graduated from the 2nd St. Petersburg Military Gymnasium (1873) and the Mikhailovsky Artillery School (1876), from which he was released as second lieutenant to the 3rd Guards and Grenadier Artillery Brigade.

Ranks: lieutenant (1877), lieutenant of the guard (1878), lieutenant (1882), staff captain of the guard with renaming as captain of the General Staff (1882), lieutenant colonel (1889), colonel (for distinction, 1893), major general (for distinction, 1903), lieutenant general (for distinction, 1909), general from infantry (1915).

He participated in the Russian-Turkish war of 1877–1878, for the difference in which he had three military orders. After the war, he was transferred to the second artillery brigade as second lieutenant in the Life Guard.

In 1882 he graduated from the Nikolaev Academy of the General Staff in the 1st category. At the end of the academy, he was an assistant to the senior adjutant of the headquarters of the Vilna Military District (1887–1889). He served as the head officer for assignments at the headquarters of the Vilnius HE (1889), senior adjutant of the headquarters of the Vilnius HE (1889-1891) and the head officer for special assignments at the headquarters of the Vilnius HE (1891-1893). In 1893-1896 he was the head officer under the command of the chief of the Vilna local brigade. He was the chief of staff of the 2nd Cavalry (1896-1898) and 27th Infantry (1898-1900) divisions.

Then he commanded the 115th Vyazemsky Infantry (1900-1903) and the Lithuanian Life Guards (1903-1908) regiments, the 2nd brigade of the 3rd Guards Infantry Division (1908-1909) and the 22nd Infantry Division (1909-1912).
On 30 May 1912 he was appointed head of the 1st Guards Infantry Division, with which he entered the First World War. He was awarded the Order of St. George 4th degree and St. George's Arms
“For the fact that in the battle of 3–6 November 1914, in the area of dd. Suloshov, Rzheplin and the village. Skala, commanding the 1st Guards Infantry Division, was personally under the actual artillery fire of the enemy during all four days of the battle and directed the repulsion of repeated attacks by the superior forces of the enemy, who persistently tried to take possession of the flank of the division during all these days. Holding the position of his division, on 7 November he transferred his plot to other units. "

On 28 December 1914 he was appointed commander of the 23rd Army Corps.

On 1 June 1915, at the junction of the 3rd and 8th armies, an army group was created under the command of Olokhov. By the end of June 1915, Olokhov's group was reorganized into the 13th Army (“Special”), whose commander was V.N. Gorbatovsky.

From 25 August 1915 - commander of the Guards Corps; from 8 December 1915 - commander of the 2nd Guards Corps.

From 27 May 1916 he was a member of the Alexander Committee on the wounded.

In 1917 he retired. In 1918, he was enlisted in the Red Army, where he was an employee of the General Directorate of Archival Affairs (Glavarkhiv) under the People's Commissariat of the RSFSR until 1920.

He died in 1920 in Petrograd after a long illness. He was buried at the Novodevichy cemetery in St. Petersburg.

Awards
Order of St. Stanislav 3rd Art. with swords and bow (1878);
Order of St. Anne 4th Art. (1878);
Order of St. Anne, 3rd art. with swords and bow (1879);
Order of St. Stanislav, 2nd art. (1883);
Order of St. Anne, 2nd art. (1890);
Order of St. Vladimir 4th art. (1896);
Order of St. Vladimir 3rd art. (1900);
Order of St. Stanislav 1st Art. (1906);
Order of St. Anne 1st Art. (1912);
Order of St. Vladimir, 2nd art. with swords (1914);
Order of St. George 4th Art. (VP 4.11.1914);
Order of the White Eagle with swords (VP 19.2.1915);
Order of St. Alexander Nevsky (29.4.1915);
St. George's weapons (VP 2.6.1915).

Foreign
Romanian Iron Cross (1878).

Family
He was married to Olga Ignatyevna Olokhova (1868–1955), had six children.

Literature
The Scout magazine for 18 November 1914, No. 1255. With 789.
Memoirs of O. I. Olokhova. We served the Fatherland, 2012.

References
 
 Биография на Хроносе
 Биография на сайте «Русская императорская армия»

1857 births
1920 deaths
Russian military personnel of World War I